BMO Real Estate Partners, formerly F&C REIT, is a property fund and asset management company based in London, UK with  £7.5 billion assets under management as at 31 December 2014. Nick Criticos
is the CEO.

The company was formed by the merger of F&C Asset Management’s property business and REIT Asset Management in 2008.

Properties
F&C's portfolio includes St Christopher's Place in London, the Alhambra Centre in Barnsley, and Freshney Place in Grimsby (2013).

References

Real estate investment trusts of the United Kingdom